1999–2000 Indiana State Sycamores men's basketball team represented Indiana State University during the 1999–2000 men's college basketball season. They earned an at-large bid to the NCAA Tournament where they lost in the first round to Texas.

Royce Waltman was MVC coach of the year award and Nate Green was the conference player of the year award.

Schedule

|-
!colspan=9 style=| Missouri Valley tournament

|-
!colspan=9 style=| 2000 NCAA tournament

References 

Indiana State Sycamores men's basketball seasons
Indiana State Sycamores men's basketball
Indiana State Sycamores men's basketball
Indiana State
Indiana State